

List

Special routes

See also

References

External links

 
U.S. Highways